"Could This Be Real" is the third single from drum and bass artist Sub Focus released from the self-titled debut album Sub Focus. The song features writing and uncredited vocals from Linden Reeves (also known as Stamina MC). It is an electro house and breakbeat song and one of the few non-drum and bass tracks from the album. The single managed to reach number 41 on the UK Singles Chart and number four on the UK Dance Chart.

Music video
A music video to accompany the release of "Could This Be Real" was first released onto YouTube on 25 December 2009 at a total length of two minutes and forty-two seconds.

Track listing

Chart performance

Release history

References

2010 singles
Sub Focus songs
RAM Records singles
2009 songs
Songs written by Sub Focus